Piovani is an Italian surname. Notable people with the surname include:

Gianpietro Piovani (born 1968), Italian footballer and manager
Luana Piovani (born 1976), Brazilian actress and model
Maurizio Piovani, Italian racing cyclist
Nicola Piovani (born 1946), Italian musician
Pina Piovani (1897–1955), Italian stage and film actress

See also
 Piovano

Italian-language surnames